Zsuzsanna Tomori (born 18 June 1987) is a Hungarian handballer for Ferencvárosi TC and the Hungarian national team.

Career

Club
Tomori started to play handball at the age of 12 and signed her first professional contract with Vasas SC in 2004. Considered one of the best players of her position in the Nemzeti Bajnokság I, she moved to league champions Győri ETO KC in 2007. After spent two successful seasons at the club, winning the league and finishing runner-up in the Champions League, in March 2010 dressing room troubles were revealed. As a result, first the Hungarian international was exiled to the reserve team, and after the sides could not find an appropriate solution, she left the club by mutual agreement.

As she told in an interview, several teams have traced her after she became a free agent, including Békéscsaba, Vác and other sides from abroad, but decided to join Ferencvárosi TC. She stated that the talks with FTC executives and their future plans had a great influence on her choice. She spent five seasons with them, when she got an offer from her former club Győri ETO and decided to grab the opportunity, therefore she signed a contract with them. After the agreement went public, she explained her choice as: "I signed for Győr, because I want to win Champions League."

In March 2019 she decided not to extend her contract with Győr and signed a deal with Siófok. About her decision, she said: "Győr wanted to keep me, but they offered only a one-year contract, meanwhile Siófok gave me a 3-year offer, and this was decisive at the end because my goal is to have a secure and stable future."

In 2021 she decided to terminate her contract with Siófok and try herself out abroad for the first time in her career, signing a 1-year contract with Vipers Kristiansand. After the contract expired, she decided to move back to Hungary, and signed with her former club, FTC.

International
She debuted in the national team on 4 April 2006 against Norway. Her first major tournament was the World Championship in 2007, which was followed by the European Championship and the Olympic Games one year later. She was also present on the World Championship in 2009, 2013, 2015, 2019, on the European Championship in 2010, 2012, 2014, 2020 and at the Olympics in 2008, 2020.

Injuries
Tomori got injured seriously for the first time in December 2015 at the World Championship during the match against Poland. The diagnosis was anterior cruciate ligament tear and a partial lateral ligament injury. She was out for eight months and returned to handball in autumn 2016. During a training in October she felt that her operated knee hurts, the doctors after an examination decided that one more surgery is needed. Tomori recovered from this surgery for January 2017. After the 2016–17 season another operation was needed, because of a cyst that has emerged at the location of the screw exception. She recovered in time and was able to start the preparations with her team, Győri ETO. In October 2017 during a 2018 EURO qualification match against Belarus she has suffered a knee cartilage injury, which required an arthroscopic procedure. Her recovery was successful, she could return to the court in January 2018. In March 2018, during a match against The Netherlands she twisted her other, "healthy" knee unluckily and suffered a rupture in her anterior cruciate ligament. Later she admitted, that after this injury she was thinking about retirement, but other athletes – like Anita Görbicz – convinced her, that she can still play on the highest level, even if both knees have been seriously injured before. She made her comeback in January 2019, after 9 months of successful rehabilitation.

Achievements
EHF Champions League:
Winner: 2017, 2018, 2019, 2022
Finalist: 2009, 2016
Semifinalist: 2008
EHF Cup Winners' Cup:
Winner: 2011, 2012
Nemzeti Bajnokság I:
Winner: 2008, 2009, 2015, 2016, 2017, 2018, 2019
Magyar Kupa:
Winner: 2008, 2009, 2010, 2016, 2018, 2019
Eliteserien:
Winner: 2022
Norwegian Cup:
Winner: 2021
European Championship:
Bronze Medalist: 2012

Individual awards
Hungarian Handballer of the Year: 2012, 2015, 2016 
EHF Champions League Top Scorer: 2013 
 Team of the Tournament Left Back of the Baia Mare Champions Trophy: 2014
 Best Defender of the EHF Champions League: 2018

References

External links

Career statistics at Worldhandball

1987 births
Living people
Hungarian female handball players
Handball players from Budapest
Handball players at the 2008 Summer Olympics
Olympic handball players of Hungary
Győri Audi ETO KC players
Ferencvárosi TC players (women's handball)
Siófok KC players
Handball players at the 2020 Summer Olympics